Poker face may refer to:

 Blank expression or poker face

Film and television
 Poker Face (film), a 2022 film directed by and starring Russel Crowe
 Poker Face (TV series), a 2023 American mystery drama series
 PokerFace, a 2006–2007 British game show
 PokerFace: Dil Sachcha Chehra Jhootha, the Indian version
 "Poker Face" (Grey's Anatomy), an episode of Grey's Anatomy
 "Poker Face", an episode of Talking Tom and Friends
 Poker-Face, a fictional villain in SilverHawks

Music 
 "Poker Face" (song), by Lady Gaga, 2008
 "Poker Face" (Ayumi Hamasaki song), 1998
 "Poker Face", a 1997 song from the album Déjà-vu by Hitomi
 "Poker Face", a 2001 song from Bad Dreams by Swollen Members
 "Poker Face", a 2013 song from Miss Monochrome by Yui Horie

Nickname 
 Ebbie Goodfellow (1906–1985), Canadian National Hockey League player
 Hanns Scharff (1907–1992), German World War II interrogator

Other uses 
 Poker Face: A Girlhood Among Gamblers, a 2003 memoir by Katy Lederer
 Pokerface, a 1977 poetry collection by Billy Collins

Lists of people by nickname